Solntsev (from солнце meaning sun) is a Russian masculine surname, its feminine counterpart is Solntseva. It may refer to
Fedor Solntsev (1801–1892), Russian painter and historian of art
Yuliya Solntseva (1901–1989), Soviet film director and actress
Yuri Solntsev (born 1980), Russian football player

Russian-language surnames